Richard A. Lovett (born October 28, 1953) is an American science fiction author and science writer from Portland, Oregon. He has written numerous short stories and factual articles that have appeared in multiple literary and scientific magazines and websites, including Analog Science Fiction and Fact, National Geographic News, Nature, New Scientist, Science, Scientific American, Cosmos, and Psychology Today.

Lovett is one of the most prolific and decorated writers in Analogs 80-plus-year history. His first formal appearance in the magazine other than a 1993 letter to the editor was "Tricorders, Yactograms and the Future of Analytical Chemistry: When 'Nano-' Isn't Small Enough" (April 1999), a science article. His first fiction appearance was the novelette "Equalization" (March 2003).

Lovett first won the magazine's reader's choice award, the Analytical Laboratory (AnLab), in 2002 for a 2001 fact article, "Up in Smoke: How Mt. St. Helens Blasted Conventional Scientific Wisdom" (April 2001). Since then he has won the award a record thirteen times, three times for novelettes, three times for novellas, and seven times for science articles. Including the 2015 awards, he has also placed in the top five 33 additional times, more than any other Analog contributor. As of the July/Aug 2015 issue, his work had appeared in the magazine 134 times, placing him second place on the magazine's all-time contributor list. In addition to writing fiction and science articles for the magazine, he has also written profiles (called Biologs) since 2006, and a series of how-to articles about writing short stories. These special features comprise about a quarter of his total contributions to the magazine.

His science fiction stories have also appeared in Nature, Cosmos, Abyss and Apex, Esli (Russian translation), Running Times, and Marathon & Beyond.

Coaching and sports writing
In addition to writing science fiction, Lovett is coach of Team Red Lizard, a 240-member running club in Portland, Oregon, as well as of seven women who qualified to compete for the 2012, 2016, or 2020 U.S. Olympic Marathon Team, and one member of the U.S. Snow Shoe Racing Team. He writes frequent features about distance running for Running Times magazine and Marathon & Beyond, Podium Runner, Women's Running, and Peak Performance (UK), and has written Olympic-related news articles and features for National Geographic News, Cosmos, and the San Diego Union-Tribune newspaper. He has also co-authored two running books with marathon legend Alberto Salazar, plus two books on bicycle touring and one on cross-country skiing.

Sports themes, particularly running, have infused seven of his science fiction stories: "Equalization" (Analog, March 2003),  "Original Sin" (Analog, June 2006), "Olympic Talent" (Nature, July 5, 2007), "Excellence" (Analog, Jan/Feb 2009), "Jak and the Beanstalk" (Analog, Jul/Aug 2011), "Running 2030" (Running Times, Dec 2011), and "Morgan's Run" (Cosmos, Nov/Dec 2012). 
 "Equalization" is the story of a futuristic 10,000-meter runner in a world in which runners are annually handicapped by mind/body swaps in which highly competitive individuals receive less-talented bodies; 
  "Original Sin" centers around a memory-recording device that allows coaches to feel exactly what their runners feel in training; 
  "Olympic Talent" and "Excellence" involve athletes who improve performance through gene doping, a technology in which gene therapy methods are used to enhance strength and endurance, 
  "Jak and the Beanstalk" centers around an endurance athlete who finds a way to climb a space elevator (the titular "beanstalk") all the way to geosynchronous orbit,
  "Running 2030" is a day in the life of a futuristic runner.
  "Morgan's Run" addresses the same themes as "Running 2030."

Bibliography

Short fiction

Collections

 Contents: A deadly intent (2008); NetPuppets (2005); New wineskins (2008); Phantom science (2010); Phantom sense (2010)

Stories
 Tiny Berries (Analog Science Fiction and Fact Sept 2003)
 Weapon of Mass Distraction (Analog Science Fiction and Fact 2004)
 Distant Fire (Analog Science Fiction and Fact 2004)
 Promises (Analog Science Fiction and Fact 2004)
 Caretaker (Analog Science Fiction and Fact 2004)
 A Few Good Men (Analog Science Fiction and Fact 2005)
 Tomorrow's Strawberries (Analog Science Fiction and Fact 2005)
 NetPuppets (Analog Science Fiction and Fact 2005) with Mark Niemann-Ross
 Zero Tolerance (Analog Science Fiction and Fact 2005)
 911 Backup (Analog Science Fiction and Fact 2005)
 Dinosaur Blood (Analog Science Fiction and Fact 2006)
 Hiking the Roof of the World (Nature 2006)
 Numismatist (Analog Science Fiction and Fact 2006)
 Original Sin (Analog Science Fiction and Fact 2006)
 A Pound of Flesh (Analog Science Fiction and Fact Sept 2006)
 Nigerian Scam (Analog Science Fiction and Fact 2006)
 The Unrung Bells of the Marie [sic] Celeste (Analog Science Fiction and Fact 2007)
 Bambi Steaks(Analog Science Fiction and Fact 2007)
 The Road to Heather Cove (Abyss & Apex 2007)
 The Last of the Weathermen (Analog Science Fiction and Fact 2007)
 Olympic Talent (Nature 2007)
 A Plutoid By Any Other Name . . . (Analog Science Fiction and Fact 2007)
 Bug Eyes (Analog Science Fiction and Fact Nov 2008)
 Excellence (Analog Science Fiction and Fact 2009, reprinted in condensed version, Running Times 2009)
 Attack of the Grub-Eaters (Analog Science Fiction and Fact 2009)
 Carpe Mañana (Abyss & Apex 2009)
 Snowflake Kisses (Analog Science Fiction and Fact 2010) with Holly Hight
 Sense of Wonder (Nature, vol. 465, p. 656, June 3, 2010)
 Spludge (Analog Science Fiction and Fact, 2010)
 Multivac's Singularity (Analog Science Fiction and Fact Jan/Feb 2011)
 Jak and the Beanstalk (Analog Science Fiction and Fact Jul/Aug 2011)
 Running 2030 (Running Times, December 2011, pp. 41–44)
 Mother's Tattoos (Analog Science Fiction and Fact March 2012)
 Nightfall on the Peak of Eternal Light (Analog Science Fiction and Fact July/Aug 2012) with William Gleason

Non fiction
 
 
 
 
 
 
 
 
 
 
 
 
 
   Polish Translationin Nowa Fantastyka, October 2004.
 
 
 
 
 
 
 
 
 
 
 
 
 
 
 
 
 
 
 
 
 
 
 
 
 
 
 
 
 
 
 
 
 
 
 
 
 
 
 
 
 
 
 
 
 
 
 
 
 
 
 
 
 
 
 
 
 
 
 
 
 
 
 
 
 
 
 
 
 
 
 
 
 
 
 
 
 
 
 
 
 
 
 
 
 
 
Writing articles

References

External links
 The Winning Athletes
 Olympic Talent
 Team Red Lizard

1953 births
Living people
American male novelists
American male short story writers
American science fiction writers
American short story writers
Analog Science Fiction and Fact people
University of Michigan Law School alumni
Novelists from Oregon